Soleymi Antonieta Caraballo Hernández (born 17 June 1994) is a Venezuelan freestyle wrestler. She is a gold medalist in her event at the Bolivarian Games (both in 2017 and 2022), the 2022 South American Games and the 2022 Pan American Wrestling Championships.

She also won medals at the Central American and Caribbean Games (2014 and 2018) and the South American Games (2014 and 2018).

Career 

She competed at the Central American and Caribbean Games both in 2014 and in 2018: she won the silver medal in the women's 63 kg event in 2014 and again in the 68 kg event in 2018. She won the silver medal in her event at the 2018 Pan American Wrestling Championships held in Lima, Peru.

She competed in the women's 68 kg event at the 2018 World Wrestling Championships held in Budapest, Hungary. In 2021, she failed to qualify for the Olympics at the World Olympic Qualification Tournament held in Sofia, Bulgaria.

She won the gold medal in her event at the 2022 Pan American Wrestling Championships held in Acapulco, Mexico. She also won the gold medal in her event at the 2022 Bolivarian Games held in Valledupar, Colombia.

She won the gold medal in her event at the 2022 South American Games held in Asunción, Paraguay.

Achievements

References

External links 
 

Living people
1994 births
Place of birth missing (living people)
Venezuelan female sport wrestlers
Central American and Caribbean Games silver medalists for Venezuela
Competitors at the 2014 Central American and Caribbean Games
Competitors at the 2018 Central American and Caribbean Games
Central American and Caribbean Games medalists in wrestling
Pan American Wrestling Championships medalists
South American Games gold medalists for Venezuela
South American Games silver medalists for Venezuela
South American Games bronze medalists for Venezuela
South American Games medalists in wrestling
Competitors at the 2014 South American Games
Competitors at the 2018 South American Games
Competitors at the 2022 South American Games
21st-century Venezuelan women